Agua Caliente, Aguas Calientes or Aguascalientes (Spanish for 'hot/warm water(s)' or 'hot spring(s)') may refer to:

Places

Central America
 Agua Caliente, El Salvador
 San Antonio Aguas Calientes, Guatemala

Mexico
 Aguascalientes, a state in Mexico
 Aguascalientes Municipality, a municipality in the state
 Aguascalientes City, the capital of the state and municipal seat of the municipality
 Aguascalientes Territory, a federal territory (1835–1857), which became the state
 Agua Caliente, Tijuana, Mexico

South America
 Aguas Calientes caldera, a caldera in Argentina
 Aguas Calientes, Jujuy, a town in Argentina
 Aguas Calientes, Peru, near Machu Picchu
 Aguas Calientes, Venezuela (disambiguation), two rivers
 Aguas Calientes, hot spring in southern Chile
 Aguas Calientes (volcano), a volcano in Chile

United States

Arizona
 Agua Caliente, Arizona
 Agua Caliente Mountains, a small range in southwest Arizona
 Agua Caliente Regional Park, in Tucson, Arizona

California

 Agua Caliente, former name of Palm Springs, California
 Agua Caliente Airport, in San Diego County
 Agua Caliente County Park, San Diego County
 Agua Caliente Indian Reservation, Riverside County
 Caliente, California, Kern County, formerly Agua Caliente
 Fetters Hot Springs-Agua Caliente, California
 Rancho Agua Caliente (Higuera), a Mexican land grant in Alameda County
 Rancho Agua Caliente (Pina), a Mexican land grant in Sonoma County
 Tassajara Hot Springs, also recorded on mining claims as Agua Caliente, in Monterey County

Sports
 Agua Caliente Clippers, an American professional Basketball team in Ontario, California
 Agua Caliente Open, a defunct golf tournament played in Tijuana, Mexico
 Agua Caliente Racetrack, a bullring and Thoroughbred race track in Tijuana, Baja California, Mexico
 Agua Caliente Handicap, a defunct thoroughbred horse race
 New Arena at Agua Caliente, a sports arena being developed in Palm Springs, California

Other uses
 Agua Caliente Band of Cahuilla Indians, a Native American tribe of the U.S. state of California
 Agua Caliente Casino Resort Spa, Rancho Mirage, California, U.S.
 Agua Caliente Casino and Hotel, Tijuana, Baja California, Mexico
 Agua Caliente Solar Project, a solar power station in Yuma County, Arizona, U.S.

See also
 
 
 
 Agua Caliente Casino (disambiguation)
 Convention of Aguascalientes, a meeting during the Mexican Revolution

Spanish language